The United States ambassador to Guinea is the official representative of the government of the United States to the government of Guinea. This is a list of the United States ambassadors to Guinea

Ambassadors

See also
Guinea – United States relations
Foreign relations of Guinea
Ambassadors of the United States

References

United States Department of State: Background notes on Guinea

External links
 United States Department of State: Chiefs of Mission for Guinea
 United States Department of State: Guinea
 United States Embassy in Conakry

Guinea

United States